Sharif Khasruzzaman (1945 - 18 July 2018) was a Bangladesh Awami League politician and the former Member of Parliament of Narail-2.

Career
Khasruzzaman was elected to parliament from Narail-2 as a Bangladesh Awami League candidate in 1991 and June 1996. He joined Bangladesh Nationalist Party after not receiving the Awami League nomination in 2008.

Death 
Sharif Khasruzzaman died on 18 July 2018, Anwar Khan Modern Hospital, Dhanmondi in Dhaka.

References

1945 births
2018 deaths
People from Narail District
Awami League politicians
Bangladesh Nationalist Party politicians
5th Jatiya Sangsad members
7th Jatiya Sangsad members